San Gabriel High School (SGHS) is a public high school located in Los Angeles County, California and operated by the Alhambra Unified School District. It is almost entirely in the city limits of Alhambra with a small portion in the city limits of San Gabriel.

It traditionally served students residing in San Gabriel although the balance was shifted in 1994 when San Gabriel Unified School District separated itself from Alhambra Unified. Upon separation, SGUSD opened Gabrielino High School to serve its students. San Gabriel High School now serves students from portions of Alhambra, San Gabriel, and Rosemead.

History
San Gabriel High School first opened its doors in September 1955. It has been open with a couple of new buildings being built since then.

Principals 
 
 Arthur H. Kruger (1955–1971)
 R. Reed Channell (1971–1975)
 Elizabeth C. Luttrell (1975–1977)
 Jack B. Mount (1977–1996)
 Linda Marryott (1996–1998)
 Barbara Randolph (1998–2000)
 Alex Ayala (2000–2004)
 Marsha Gilbert (2004–2007)
 Jim Schofield (2007–2015)
 Debbie Stone (2015- )

Assistant principals 
 
 Rene Regalado, Asst. Principal of Guidance and Pupil Services
 Jocelyn Castro, Assistant Principal of Instruction
 Jesse Toribio, Asst. Principal of Business and Activities
 Carmen Mejia, Asst. Principal of Student Services
 Shaun Thomas, Asst. Principal of Student Services

Academics 
Students of San Gabriel High should complete 220 credits in order to graduate. San Gabriel offers 15 Advanced Placement (AP) courses including: English language, English literature, Calculus AB, Calculus BC, Statistics, World History, US History, American Government, Chemistry, Biology,  Physics 1, Psychology,  Spanish language,  Chinese language, and Art History.

Athletics

Cross country 
The San Gabriel Cross Country team took 4th in State in 1991, led by a Cross Country champion, Angel Martinez.

School demographics 
The school has 2,429 students and 76 full-time teachers. The ethnic composition of San Gabriel High School is 57.1% Asian, 41% Hispanic, 1% White, 1% Two or More Races, 0.2% African American, and 0.1% Pacific Islander.

1988 hostage incident
Jeffrey Lyne Cox, a senior at San Gabriel High School, took an AR-15 semi-automatic rifle to school on April 26, 1988, and held a humanities class of about 60 students hostage for over 30 minutes. Cox held the gun to one student when the teacher doubted Cox would cause harm and stated that he would prove it to her. At that time three students escaped out a rear door and were fired upon. Cox was later tackled and disarmed by another student. A friend of Cox's told the press that Cox had been inspired by the Kuwait Airways Flight 422 hijacking and by the novel Rage, which Cox had read over and over again and with which he strongly identified. He pleaded no contest to charges of kidnapping and assault with a deadly weapon after the jury deadlocked. He was sentenced to five years in prison.

Notable alumni

Roy Conli, Academy Award winning producer
George Dyer, football coach
Bill Fisk, football coach
John Grabow, MLB pitcher
Felicia Hano, artistic gymnast
David Henry Hwang, dramatist
Candy Johnson, singer and dancer
Mike Krukow, MLB pitcher, commentator
Steve Martini, legal thriller author
Sylvia Mosqueda, Distance Runner
C. Rob Orr, All-American//Pan Am Games medalist-swimmer;coach

References 
^ https://www.imdb.com/name/nm0575345/

External links
San Gabriel High School Official Site
San Gabriel High School Alumni Assn.
Alhambra Unified School District Web Site
San Gabriel High School Reunion Site

High schools in Los Angeles County, California
Educational institutions established in 1955
Public high schools in California
Alhambra, California
San Gabriel, California
1955 establishments in California